Pukara Punta (Quechua pukara fortress, punta peak; ridge, "fortress peak (or ridge)", also spelled Pucará Punta) is a mountain in the Andes of Peru which reaches a height of approximately . It lies in the Junín Region, Tarma Province, on the border of the districts of Palcamayo and Cajas.

References 

Mountains of Peru
Mountains of Junín Region